George Saint-George (1841 – 5 January 1924) was a British musical instrument maker and composer.

Biography
He was born in Leipzig, Germany to English parents, and studied violin, piano and theory in Prague and Dresden. He settled in London in the 1860s.

Saint-George was a maker of viols and lutes; he was interested in the viola d'amore, and played the instrument in concerts. He composed a suite for strings L'Ancien Régime, based on 18th-century dance music, and other works.

He died in London on 5 January 1924.

His son Henry Saint-George (1866–1917) was a violinist and academic at the Trinity College of Music; he published two monographs, The Bow: Its History, Manufacture, And Use (1896) and Fiddles: Their Selection, Preservation and Betterment (1910), and was editor of The Strad magazine.

See also
 Joseph Bologne, Chevalier de Saint-Georges - an occasionally confused (but apparently unrelated) French violinist and composer

References

External links
 

1841 births
1924 deaths
Bowed string instrument makers
19th-century British composers
20th-century British composers